"Misunderstood" is a song by British pop singer Robbie Williams. Williams co-wrote and co-produced the song with Stephen Duffy from English band Duran Duran, who also plays the acoustic guitars, bass, and harmonica on the track. The song was released as the second single from Williams' hits compilation Greatest Hits in December 2004, peaking at number eight on the UK Singles Chart and reaching the top 10 in Denmark, Italy, and the Netherlands. The song was featured on the Bridget Jones: The Edge of Reason soundtrack.

Music video

The music video incorporates some of the plot of Bridget Jones: The Edge of Reason into it, including some clips of the movie. Robbie Williams is interrogated by Thai officials. At the end of the video when the main interrogator says that if Williams keeps acting up, he might be there a long time. Williams asks, "How long is a long time?". The interrogator answers, "Oh, about a millennium", to which Williams answers by turning to the camera and singing his song "Millennium". Williams stated that the song was written because of his love of Edward Scissorhands, in which the protagonist of the film was misunderstood.

Track listings
UK CD1 and European CD single
 "Misunderstood"
 "Do Me Now" (demo)

UK CD2 and Australian CD single
 "Misunderstood"
 "Please Please"
 "(I Feel It But) I Can't Explain"
 Gallery and video clip

UK DVD single
 "Misunderstood" (video—stereo and 5.1 surround sound)
 "Chemical Devotion" (audio)
 "The Postcard" (audio)
 Gallery and video clip

Credits and personnel
Credits are taken from the Greatest Hits album booklet.

Studio
 Mastered at Metropolis Mastering (London, England)

Personnel

 Robbie Williams – writing, lead vocals, production
 Stephen Duffy – writing, acoustic guitars, bass, harmonica, production
 Claire Worrall – backing vocals, piano, string arrangement
 Gary Nuttall – electric guitar
 Melvin Duffy – pedal steel guitar
 Chris Sharrock – drums
 Gavyn Wright – string leader
 Dave Bishop – brass
 Neil Sidwell – brass
 Steve Sidwell – brass
 Andy Strange – production
 Bob Clearmountain – mixing
 Tony Cousins – mastering

Charts

References

2004 singles
2004 songs
Chrysalis Records singles
Robbie Williams songs
Songs written by Robbie Williams
Songs written by Stephen Duffy